Constantine Ducas (Kōnstantínos Doúkas), (? – 1704) son of George Ducas, was a Voivode (Prince) of Moldavia between April 1693 and December 18, 1695 and September 12, 1700 – July 26, 1703.

Life
Although backed to the throne by his father-in-law, Prince Constantin Brâncoveanu of Wallachia, Constantine Ducas had indebted himself to Constantinople creditors. This made him raise taxes and reintroduce the văcărit (the confiscation of every tenth head of cattle).

He sealed matrimonial alliances with the Costineşti boyar family (to which Miron Costin belonged) and persecuted the Cantemirs, the family of his predecessor Constantin.

After delaying payments of the tribute and ordering the killing of the inspecting kapucu, Ducas was deposed by the Ottoman overlord.

He came to the throne for a second time, after Brâncoveanu had obtained the removal of their common rival Antioh Cantemir. Yet again reacting against the Cantemireşti (who fled the country), doubling taxes and enforcing the văcărit, Ducas only fell into disgrace after his relations with Brâncoveanu soured.

Ancestry

Rulers of Moldavia
Year of birth unknown
Year of death unknown
17th-century monarchs in Europe
18th-century monarchs in Europe